The Ukrainian referendum, 1991 can refer to either the:

 1991 Ukrainian sovereignty referendum
 1991 Ukrainian independence referendum